Rita Bradshaw (born 1949) is a British romance novelist. She wrote historical romances under her real name and contemporary romances under the pseudonym Helen Brooks.

Biography
Rita Bradshaw was born in 1949 in Northampton, England. She met her husband Clive when she was 16. They have three children.

A former secretary, she began writing in 1990 at the age of 40, and published her first novel in 1992 at Mills & Boon under the pseudonym Helen Brooks. Since 1998, she has also published historical romances under her actual name.

She lives in Northampton.

Bibliography

As Helen Brooks

Single Novels
Stone Angel (1992)
Deceitful Lover (1992)
The Devil You Know (1992)
Cruel Conspiracy (1992)
Gentle Savage (1993)
Cold Fire (1993)
Sweet Betrayal (1993)
And the Bride Wore Black (1993)
A Heartless Marriage (1993)
Bitter Honey (1993)
Dark Oasis (1994)
Knight in Black Velvet (1994)
The Sultan's Favourite (1994)
Web of Darkness (1994)
Lovers Not Friends (1994)
Angels Do Have Wings (1994)
Lace and Satin (1995)
The Twisted Cord (1995) (re-edited as Rita Bradshaw)
Fire Beneath the Ice (1995)
The Marriage Solution (1995)
Dream Wedding (1996)
Reckless Flirtation (1996)
For a Mother's Love (1996)
Satisfaction Guaranteed (1997)
Treasure Hunt Vacation (1998)
The Bride's Secret (1998)
A Man Worth Waiting for (1998)
Very Private Revenge (1998)
Mistletoe Mistress (1998)
The Marriage Quest (1999)
A Boss in a Million (1999)
Mistress to a Millionaire (1999)
A Whirlwind Marriage (2000)
Sleeping Partners (2001)
The Greek Tycoon's Bride (2002)
Christmas at His Command (2002)
The Passionate Husband (2004)
A Ruthless Agreement (2005)
Italian Tycoon's Bride (2006)
The Billionaire Boss's Secretary Bride (2008)
The Boss's Inexperienced Secretary (2009)
The Millionaire's Christmas Wife (2009)
Sweet Surrender With the Millionaire (2010)

Contract Marriage Series
Husband by Contract (1997)
Second Marriage (1997)

A Proposal Series
A Convenient Proposal (2000)
A Suspicious Proposal (2000)

Stolen Moments Series Multi-Author
Bitter Honey (1993)

From Here To Paternity Series Multi-Author
The Price of a Wife (1997)

Expecting! Series Multi-Author
The Baby Secret (1999)

Nine to Five Series Multi-Author
The Irresistible Tycoon (2001)
The Mistress Contract (2001)

Latin Lovers Series Multi-Author
A Spanish Affair (2001)

In Love With Her Boss Series Multi-Author
The Parisian Playboy (2002)
Mistress by Agreement (2003)

Do Not Disturb Series Multi-Author
The Christmas Marriage Mission (2003)

Dinner at 8 Series Multi-Author
His Marriage Ultimatum (2004)
The Millionaire's Prospective Wife (2005)
The Billionaire's Marriage Mission (2006)
His Christmas Bride (2007)

Tall, Dark and Sexy Series Multi-Author
The Billionaire's Virgin Bride (2008)

Ruthless! Series Multi-Author
Ruthless Tycoon, Innocent Wife (2008)

Omnibus Collections
Christmas Gift Pack (2000)
Blind-date Brides (2002)
The Devil You Know / Cruel Conspiracy (2004)
Deceitful Lover / Gentle Savage (2004)
Suspicious Proposal / Convenient Proposal (2005)
Man Worth Waiting for / Marriage Quest (2006)

Collections In Collaboration
The Parent Trap (1997) (with Emma Goldrick)
French Kiss (2001) (with Catherine George)
Desert Destinies (2001) (with Emma Darcy and Mary Lyons)
A Christmas Seduction (2001) (with Emma Darcy and Catherine Spencer)
Sealed with a Kiss (2002) (with Judith Bowen and Debbie Macomber) (My Funny Valentine / Mom And Mr. Valentine / Her Secret Valentine)
Business Affairs (2003) (with Lynne Graham and Kim Lawrence)
Contract Husbands (2003) (with Catherine George and Jessica Steele)
Marrying the Boss (2003) (with Alison Roberts and Jessica Steele)
Falling for the Boss (2005) (with Barbara McMahon and Cathy Williams)
Her Greek Millionaire (2005) (with Helen Bianchin and Sara Wood)
After Office Hours... (2006) (with Jessica Steele and Lee Wilkinson)
Christmas Treasures (2006) (with Caroline Anderson and Betty Neels)
City Heat (2007) (with Catherine George and Rebecca Winters)
It Happened At Christmas (2007) (with Penny Jordan and Carol Wood) (Bride At Bellfield Mill / Family For Hawthorn Farm / Tilly Of Tap House)
Mistress by Consent (2007) (with Margaret Way and Sara Wood)
The Joy of Christmas (2007) (with Betty Neels and Margaret Way)
Winter Waifs (2007) (with Penny Jordan and Carol Wood)
Reckless Flirtation / Luc's Revenge (2008) (with Catherine George)
Bride at Bellfield Mill / Family for Hawthorn Farm / Tilly of Tap House (2008) (with Penny Jordan and Carol Wood)
A Passionate Affair (2009) (with Elizabeth Power and Kathryn Ross)
Her Mediterranean Boss (2009) (with Barbara McMahon and Trish Morey)
Millionaire's Woman (2009) (with Catherine George and Angie Ray)

As Rita Bradshaw

Single novels
Alone Beneath the Heaven (1998)
Reach for Tomorrow (1999)
Ragamuffin Angel (2000)
The Stony Path (2001)
The Urchin's Song (2002)
Candles in the Storm (2003)
The Most Precious Thing (2004)
Always I'll Remember (2005)
The Rainbow Years (2006)
Skylarks at Sunset (2007)
Eve and Her Sisters (2008)
Above the Harvest Moon (2008)
Gilding the Lily (2009)
Born to Trouble (2009)
Forever Yours (2010)
Break of Dawn (2011)
Dancing in the Moonlight (2013)
Beyond the Veil of Tears (2014)
The Colours of Love (2015)
Snowflakes in the Wind (2016)
A Winter Love Song (2017)
Beneath a Frosty Moon (2018)
One Snowy Night (2019)
The Storm Child (2020)

References and Resources

1949 births
Living people
English romantic fiction writers
English women novelists
Women romantic fiction writers
20th-century pseudonymous writers
21st-century pseudonymous writers
Pseudonymous women writers
People from Northampton